Oleksandr Volodymyrovych Hereha (born 27 June 1967) is a Ukrainian businessman and politician currently serving as a People's Deputy of Ukraine from Ukraine's 192nd electoral district since 12 December 2012. One of the richest men in Ukraine, Hereha and his wife Halyna founded home improvement chain Epicentr K in 2003. He is one of the richest men in Ukraine, with a net worth of $1.7 billion in 2021.

Early life and career 
Oleksandr Volodymyrovych Hereha was born on 27 June 1967 in Horodok, Khmelnytskyi Oblast, in what was then the Ukrainian Soviet Socialist Republic. His parents were factory workers.

Business career 
Hereha began working as a schoolboy, working at the local bread factory and sovkhoz on school holidays. In 1991, he founded a ceramic tiling and plumbing fixture service, before opening a retail store in 1996.

In 2003, Hereha and his wife Halyna founded Epicentr K, a gardening and home improvement chain which also owns the Nova Line supermarket chain and the Intersport sports retailer. , 60 million people use Epicentr K's online services. Epicentr K has also forayed into agribusiness, owning its own production facilities and absorbing 19 production facilities in 2017.

The Hereha family has invested over ₴6 billion into agribusiness, with plans to invest an additional ₴2.5 billion in grain elevators. 20 livestock farms are owned by the Herehas. In 2019, they invested ₴3 billion into the development of a ceramic tile factory in Kalynivka, Fastiv Raion, Kyiv Oblast.

Hereha is one of the richest people in Ukraine, with a net worth of $1.7 billion according to Kyiv Post in 2021. According to the Pandora Papers, Hereha and his wife own five offshore companies in Cyprus.

Business activities in Russia and Russian-occupied Crimea 
In 2018, it became known that the Hereha family had continued the operations of Epicentr K in Crimea following the peninsula's 2014 annexation by Russia. It was additionally discovered that they had been operating a company in Russia's Moscow Oblast. Hereha has claimed that he does not control Epicentr K in Crimea since the Russian annexation.

Political career 
Hereha was first elected as a People's Deputy of Ukraine in the 2012 Ukrainian parliamentary election as the candidate from Ukraine's 192nd electoral district. Elected as an independent, he joined the Party of Regions faction in the Verkhovna Rada (Ukraine's parliament). In 2014, he voted in favour of the anti-protest laws aimed at curbing the Euromaidan protests. He left the Party of Regions faction in February 2014.

In the 2014 Ukrainian parliamentary election, he won re-election with 73.86% of the vote, defeating the next-closest challenger, Myroslav Musiy, from the People's Front. He founded the party  in 2015. In the 2019 Ukrainian parliamentary election, he was again re-elected as a People's Deputy, winning 45.95% of the vote and defeating his closest competitor, Vasyl Humenyuk, from Servant of the People. Following his election, he became a member of For the Future. He is a member of the Verkhovna Rada Committee on tax, finance, and customs policy.

References 

1967 births
Living people
People from Khmelnytskyi Oblast
Seventh convocation members of the Verkhovna Rada
Eighth convocation members of the Verkhovna Rada
Ninth convocation members of the Verkhovna Rada
Ukrainian businesspeople